The Bivalve Oyster Packing Houses and Docks are located along Shell Road in the Bivalve section of Commercial Township in Cumberland County, New Jersey. They were added to the National Register of Historic Places on February 28, 1996, for their significance in commerce and maritime history during the years 1870–1945. The listing includes five contributing buildings. The buildings were listed as part of the Marine and Architectural Resources of the Maurice River Cove Multiple Property Documentation Form (MPDF). The Bayshore Center, an educational museum, is located adjacent to the property at 2800 High Street.

History and description
The buildings were constructed in the 1870s in this industrial section of Port Norris, located by the mouth of the Maurice River.

The oyster schooners Cashier and A. J. Meerwald, also listed on the NRHP, are located here.

See also
National Register of Historic Places listings in Cumberland County, New Jersey

References

External links

Agricultural buildings and structures on the National Register of Historic Places in New Jersey
Buildings and structures in Cumberland County, New Jersey
Commercial Township, New Jersey
National Register of Historic Places in Cumberland County, New Jersey
New Jersey Register of Historic Places